The 2019 Asian Weightlifting Championships were held in Ningbo, China from 20 to 28 April 2019. It was the 48th men's and 29th women's championship.

Medal summary

Men

Women

Medal table 

Ranking by Big (Total result) medals 

Ranking by all medals: Big (Total result) and Small (Snatch and Clean & Jerk)

Team ranking

Men

Women

Participating nations 
214 athletes from 27 nations competed.

 (20)
 (13)
 (11)
 (8)
 (17)
 (20)
 (2)
 (17)
 (2)
 (2)
 (1)
 (2)
 (5)
 (1)
 (12)
 (2)
 (8)
 (1)
 (5)
 (1)
 (20)
 (5)
 (2)
 (16)
 (4)
 (6)
 (11)

References

External links
Results book

Asian Weightlifting Championships
2019 in weightlifting
Asian Weightlifting Championships
International weightlifting competitions hosted by China
Sport in Ningbo
Weightlifting